Maherivaratra is a municipality in Madagascar. It belongs to the district of Ambanja, which is a part of Diana Region. According to 2001 census the population of Maherivaratra was 4,151.

Maherivaratra is served by a local airport. Only primary schooling is available in town. The majority 59% of the population are farmers.  The most important crop is seeds of catechu, while other important products are coffee and rice.  Services provide employment for 1% and fishing employs 40% of the population.

References and notes 

Populated places in Diana Region